Nematolepis elliptica, is a small, bushy shrub with white flowers in small clusters from September to November. It is endemic to the south coast of New South Wales.

Description
The small bracts are almost flattened, leaf-like, smaller near apex of branch and discarded early. Flowering occurs from September to November.

Taxonomy 
This species was first formally described in 1974 by Paul G. Wilson, the description was published in the journal Nuytsia and given the name Phebalium ellipticum. In 1998 Paul G. Wilson changed the name to Nematolepis elliptica and the name change was published in the journal Nuytsia.

Distribution and habitat
Nematolepis elliptica has a restricted distribution in the ranges east of Cooma in New South Wales. It is found growing  in shrubland and forests, usually amid rocky outcrops.

References

Flora of New South Wales
elliptica
Taxa named by Paul G. Wilson